State Route 277 (SR 277) is a highway in Navajo County, Arizona, that runs from its junction with SR 260 in Heber-Overgaard to its junction with SR 77 in Snowflake.  It is an east–west route.

Route description
SR 277 is a  highway that provides a direct route connecting Heber-Overgaard and Snowflake. It does not pass through any other cities or towns. The western terminus is located at an intersection with SR 260 east of Heber-Overgaard. The highway heads northeast from this intersection and curves towards the east prior to an intersection with SR 377, which heads northeast to Holbrook while SR 277 continues to the east. It then heads east to an intersection with a spur route that provides access to a paper mill.  SR 277 heads northeast from this junction and curves back towards the east as it enter the Snowflake city limits.  The highway reaches its eastern terminus at an intersection with SR 77 in Snowflake.

Junction list

Spur route

State Route 277 Spur (SR 277S or SS 277), is a short spur of SR 277 located in unincorporated Navajo County. Locally, it is also known as Catalyst Road. Route ends at the Novo Star Wood Products paper mill.

References

277
Transportation in Navajo County, Arizona